The Women's road race H1-3 cycling event at the 2012 Summer Paralympics took place on September 7 at Brands Hatch. Fifteen riders from ten different nations competed. The race distance was 48 km.

Rachel Morris and Karen Darke chose to finish together, and crossed the finish line holding hands. A photo finish showed Morris's front wheel crossed the line first, so she was awarded the bronze medal.

Results
DNF = Did Not Finish. LAP=Lapped (8 km).

References

Women's road race H1-3
2012 in women's road cycling